The Whangamōmona River is a river of the Manawatū-Whanganui region of New Zealand's North Island. It flows generally southeast from its sources near Whangamōmona before turning east to reach the Whanganui River.

In July 2020, the name of the river was officially gazetted as Whangamōmona River by the New Zealand Geographic Board.

See also
List of rivers of New Zealand

References

Rivers of Manawatū-Whanganui
Rivers of New Zealand